William Samson Kalema, is a Ugandan chemical engineer, business consultant and entrepreneur, who serves as the managing partner of BDO East Africa, "a professional firm that offers audit, accounting, tax and business advisory services to private and public sector clients", in the countries of the East African Community and Ethiopia.

Background and education
Kalema was born at Mulago, in Kampala, Uganda's capital city. After attending primary school locally, he was admitted to Kings College Budo, where he completed his middle and high school education. He obtained his High School Diploma from Budo.

He holds a Bachelor of Science degree and a Master of Science degree, both in chemical engineering and both awarded by the University of Cambridge, in the United Kingdom. His Doctor of Philosophy degree, also in chemical engineering, was obtained from the California Institute of Technology (Caltech), in Pasadena, California, United States, in 1984.

Career
As of December 2020, his career stretches back over more than four decades. Between 1974 until 1978, he served as a Metallurgical Engineer in the copper mining industry, based in the Zambian city of Ndola. He also served as a research engineer and business analyst at the DuPont Company, based in the state of Delaware, United States, serving in that capacity between 1984 ad 1992.

In 1992, he returned to Uganda and became a consultant to government, businesses and development agencies. He has, in the past and continues, as of December 2020, to serve on a number of boards of national, regional and international organizations. Past board positions are listed in the next section of this article. As of time of writing, he is a member of the following boards:

Chairman, Board of Directors, Old Mutual Life Assurance Uganda
Director, Multichoice Uganda,
Director, Electro-Maxx Uganda Limited
Director, Interswitch East Africa
Director, African Seed Investment Fund
Board Member, Bank of Uganda, Since 2010.

Past board positions
He has served on the following boards in the past.

UK Commission for Africa set up by UK Prime Minister Tony Blair to develop a long-term strategy for international support for Africa's sustainable development, 2005
Chairman, Uganda Manufacturers Association (UMA), 2000–2002
Board member Uganda Manufacturers Association, 1994–2000
Committee Chairman, UMA Economic Sub-Committee, 1997–2000
Board Chairman, Uganda Investment Authority (UIA), 1998–2007
Member of Uganda's high-level Presidential Investors Round Table, 2004–2006 and 2009–2011
Board Chairman, DFCU Bank, 1998–2007
Board member DFCU Group, 1998–2012.
Trustee, Shell Foundation,  2005–2015,
Trustee and former Executive Chairman of the Kilimo Trust, 1997–2017
Trustee, Investment Climate Facility for Africa, 2007–2017
Chairman, Board of Trustees, Makerere Female Scholarship Foundation,
Chairman, Board of Directors, Uganda Gatsby Trust
Member of the Investment Committee of the Africa Enterprise Challenge Fund, managed by Alliance for a Green Revolution in Africa (AGRA), 2007–2013
Director, African Agricultural Capital & Chair of the African Agricultural Capital Fund I
Director, East African Breweries Limited, 2000–2009
Chairman, Board of Directors, Uganda Breweries, 2004–2009.

Professional Associations
Member; American Institute of Chemical Engineers (AIChE)
Member; Sigma Xi Scientific Honour Society

See also
 Economy of Uganda
 COMESA

References

External links
 Website of BDO East Africa

Living people
1952 births
Ugandan engineers
Ugandan chemical engineers
Ugandan businesspeople
Ganda people
Chief executive officers
People from Kampala
People from Central Region, Uganda
Commission for Africa members
Alumni of the University of Cambridge
California Institute of Technology alumni